Aerial archaeology is the study of archaeological remains by examining them from a higher altitude. In present day, this is usually achieved by satellite images or through the use of drones.

Details 
Aerial Archaeology involves interpretation and image analysis of photographic (and other kinds of images), in field research to understand archaeological features, sites, and landscapes. It enables exploration and examination of context and large land areas, on a scale unparalleled by other archaeological methods. The AARG (Aerial Archaeology Research Group) boasts that 'more archaeological features have been found worldwide through aerial photography than by any other means of survey'.

Aerial archaeological survey combines data collection and data analysis. The umbrella term 'Aerial images' includes traditional aerial photographs, satellite images, multispectral data (which captures image data within specific wavelength ranges across the electromagnetic spectrum) and hyperspectral data (similar to multi-spectral data, but more detailed).

A vast bank of aerial images exists, with parts freely available online or at specialist libraries. These are often vertical images taken for 'Area Survey', by aircraft or satellite (not necessarily for archaeological reasons). Each year a small number of aerial images are taken by archaeologists during prospective surveys.

Aerial Archaeology is used for a wide range of archaeological purposes: discovery of new sites; site recording; determining where to excavate; mapping individual sites; monitoring sites, etc. Aerial Images form the foundation of archaeological landscape mapping and the ability to study large areas is often the only possible using aerial resources.

Through the aid of vast data banks of satellite and other aerial imagery, archaeologists have access to resources that allow them to carry out these tasks.

In places yet to be documented (or where maps are considered confidential), satellite imagery is vital to providing base maps for excavation.

For data analysis, aerial images must be analysed and interpreted using specialised skill-sets. This includes an understanding of formation processes as well as contemporary history and landscape history. Often aerial archaeology will be carried out using computer programmes (such as Geographic Information System) aiding interpretation.

Despite Aerial photography seeming methodologically objective and empirical, there is possible subjectivity that merits consideration, e.g. bias when interpreting images, and errors such as conflating interpretation with description. In 'From the air: Understanding Aerial Archaeology', Brophy and Cowley argue that 'the individual plays a major role in creating the archaeological record'  in aerial archaeology, more than in other fields. For example, in aviation archaeology, subjective decisions include deciding where and when to fly, what targets to examine, what to photograph and how to photograph it, what to catalogue, and how to interpret the data.

Background 
Aerial archaeology is a well-established discipline dates back to over 80 years ago .

The advantages of gaining a good aerial view of the ground have been long appreciated by archaeologists: a high viewpoint permits a better appreciation of fine details and their relationships within the wider site context. Early investigators attempted to gain bird's eye views of sites using hot air balloons, scaffolds or cameras attached to kites. Given the military importance placed on aerial photography during the First and Second World Wars, archaeologists were able to use the technique more effectively to discover and record archaeological sites

Large sites could, for the first time, be viewed accurately, in their entirety, within their landscape context. This aided the production of drawn plans and inspired archaeologists to look beyond the discrete monument and to appreciate a site's role within its setting.

Brophy and Cowley argue that 'recording techniques in anyone country or region are bound up in archaeological tradition that are heavily influenced by social and political contexts'. Thus, aerial photography is recognised as a key part of archaeological survey in Britain, partly because it has strong local roots, especially through the RAF. However, this is not true everywhere.

Pioneers of aerial archaeology include:

 Roger Agache in Northern France
 Antoine Poidebard in Syria
 Lionel Rees in Jordan
 O. G. S. Crawford in England
 Henry Wellcome in the Sudan
 Giacomo Boni in Italy
 Dache McClain Reeves in the United States

Methods

Identifying archaeological features from above 
Certain archaeological features are more visible from the air than on the ground due to their nature.

A key concept behind interpretation in aerial archaeology is that formation processes affect site features differently after abandonment. For a site to be detected by a remote sensing method, one would expect alterations to the soil or subsoil e.g. ditches, pits, banks, mounds, walls etc. which often are visible in relief.

Tiny differences in ground conditions caused by buried features can be emphasised by a number of factors and viewed from the air:
 Shadow marks: slight differences in ground levels will cast shadows when the sun is low and are best from above.
 Cropmarks: buried ditches will hold more water and buried walls will hold less water than undisturbed ground, which causes crops to grow taller or shorter, and therefore define buried features, e.g. as tonal or colour differences. 'Frost marks': frost can also appear in winter on ploughed fields where water has naturally accumulated along the lines of buried features.
Soil marks: slight differences in soil colour between natural deposits and archaeological ones can also often show in ploughed fields as.
 Water pooling: differences in levels and buried features will also affect the way surface water behaves across a site, producing striking effects after heavy rain.

Aerial photography 
Aerial photographs can be categorised by oblique images and vertical images.

Oblique Images 
Oblique images are taken at an angle, allowing sunlight to highlight physical features on the ground through shadow.

These are often taken intentionally to observe something of potential archaeological significance. The day and time of year are essential for the most revealing images. Furthermore, features must be recognised before being photographed.

Vertical images 
Vertical images are taken with no deviation from a perpendicular angle (the image looks straight down). These make up the majority of images in the vast public (and private) image catalogues used by archaeologists. Vertical images record entire landscapes and are often used for site discovery, as well as landscape survey, placing sites in their wider context, and mapping larger areas.

For a three-dimensional effect, an overlapping pair of vertical photographs, taken from slightly offset positions, can be viewed stereoscopically.

Other 
Other methods of photographic aerial archaeology include : drones, UAV kites or balloons. It is increasingly popular to have drones carry instruments (such as thermal cameras) and survey by taking 'scores of pictures that produce an overlapping set, recording a site, feature or excavation from all angles'. These are then used alongside structures from motion software (SFM) to create 3D models.

Visible wavelength satellite imagery

LIDAR 

LIDAR (light detection and ranging) aka ALS (airborne laser scanning) uses laser scanner pulses that are beamed to the ground, from an aeroplane, and bounce back recording the landscape features. This is used to document topography, creating visualisations of the data such as digital elevation models. Ihis allows archaeologists to penetrate dense foliage, such as tree canopies, that could not easily be surveyed at such a large scale on land.

NASA LANDSAT series 
The NASA LANDSAT series (satellite observations) are often used in aerial archaeology. Renfrew and Bahn describes the techniques used as scanners that "record the intensity of reflected light and the infrared radiation from the earth surface and convert these electronically into photographic images." LANDSAT images have helped in identifying large-scale features, such as an ancient riverbed running from the Saudi Arabian desert to Kuwait.

IKONOS and QuickBird 
Satellites whose images are publicly available, include IKONOS and QuickBird. These images can be used similarly to aerial photographs, with high resolutions of 1m and 60 cm respectively. NASA Worldwind offers worldwide cover, at the cost of resolution.

Google Earth 
A useful way to access many of the satellite images (mentioned above) is through Google Earth. This includes a range of different satellite and aerial images, such as the NASA LANDSAT series, IKONOS, QuickBird, GeoEye alongside more.

CORONA 
The Cold War CORONA satellite photographs have been used extensively for base maps and provisional interpretation. In contrast to other imagery, CORONA uses two images of the same feature to create a stereoscopic view, which can allow for more accurate examination and interpretation in 3D.

Non-visible wavelengths (airborne/spaceborne)

SLAR 
SLAR (sideways looking airborne radar) is a remote sensing technique that records pulses of electromagnetic radiation from an aircraft. Richard Adams used SLAR to identify a matrix of possible Mayan water irrigation systems underneath the dense rainforest from a NASA aircraft.

SAR 
SAR (synthetic aperture radar) involves radar images that are processed to create high-resolution data. This technique stands out, as weather conditions and nightfall do not affect its results. Renfrew and Bahn describe it as a 'rapid non-destructive alternative to surface survey that does not involve the collection of artefacts'. It can be faster and less time-consuming than surface survey.

ASTER 
Advanced spaceborne thermal emission and reflection radiometer (ASTER) used to create maps of 'land surface temperature, reflectance, and elevation'. It is attached to the side of satellite Terra and can be used to create digital elevation models.

Interpretation and Mapping 
Mapping from aerial images involves the interpretation of features. This can be done from any type of image, often from different images combined.

Stereoscopic pairs are overlapping images used to examine features in  3D which can add accuracy to interpretations (eliminating effects of dusk or marks). The AARG recognise the ability to see in stereo as an 'essential qualification' for professional photo interpreters.

Images are often rectified (in terms of geometric or perspective distortions) and geo-referenced by computer programmes. Images can be layered a GIS (Geographical Information Systems) or graphics software through which interpretations can be made. Orthophotos, 3D models and more, can be created.

Due to the high-resolution nature of many of these aerial image types, the precise location of sites and excavation trenches can be planned and mapped.

Furthermore, large areas can be surveyed using overlapping images which can be translated into an accurate base map of all visible archaeological evidence.

Digital data, for example, ALS, can be used effectively in 'heavily automated workflows'  (a process that uses rule-based logic to launch tasks that run without human intervention), e.g. a six-year project using supervised automated classification to survey  of Baden-Wurttemberg in Germany, identified as many as 600,000 possible sites.

Case Studies

Caracol, Mayan City 
Aerial archaeology, specifically LIDAR, was used to study Caracol, a Mayan city in Belize, dated to 550-900 AD. Archaeologists Arlen and Diane Chase, from the University of Central Florida, worked for 25 years in the dense tropical rainforest, managing to map  of settlement. At the end of the dry season of 2009, they embarked on four continuous days of LIDAR flying, followed by three weeks of analysis by remote sensing experts. Furthermore, the landscape was modelled in  3D, leading to the discovery of possible new sites such as 'ruins, agricultural terraces and stone causeways'  (to be investigated further for a greater understanding). We can thus see the impressive effect aerial methods can have on streamlining archaeological survey, and pushing the limits of what is possible.

Homs, Syria 
In Homs, Syria we can see an interesting use of different types of satellite imagery in combination. The site is based in an area notorious for its difficulties surrounding archaeological survey, making it a perfect candidate for aerial reconnaissance. Issues involve, the diversity of terrain which can hide sites. Modern agriculture often obscures remains through practices such as deep ploughing (which removes many levees and low-lying sites from the archaeological record). Furthermore, vegetation of different types/densities frequently disguises sites, impeding site visibility.

The Homs projects combined the usage of CORONA, LANDSAT, IKONOS, and Quickbird imagery to observe "long-term human and environmental interactions" and, more broadly, to assess the landscape, over an area of 630 km2 that had no prior database of remains or aerial photography. Through fieldwork, the different applications and abilities of these satellite imagery techniques were revealed, highlighting the importance of using multiple methods of archaeological investigation together.

The LANDSAT imagery fell short when used for site detection and mapping, due to its lower resolution compared to Quickbird and IKONOS, but was most successful at characterising the environment and visualising rates of change.

CORONA imagery successfully detected single-period sites, which could not be detected by IKONOS. Furthermore, CORONA imagery assisted in exposing ancient field systems, and crop marks within fields, revealing early watercourses.

In this instance, visual detection and interpretation of satellite imagery proved more useful than processing LANDSAT imagery.

Through interpretation archaeological sites were identified as tells with low-relief soil markings, "with remains ranging from small walls less than 1 m wide to large multi period settlements." The projects as a whole demonstrated how valuable aerial archaeology is to archaeological survey, especially across terrains where other techniques are not possible.

See also
Archaeological field survey
Cropmark
Markus Casey
Shadow marks

References

Bibliography
 Bourgeois, J. and Meganck, M. (eds.) (2005). Aerial Photography and Archaeology 2003. A Century of Information. Archaeological Reports Ghent University 4. Ghent: Academia Press. 
 Brophy, K. and Cowley, D. (2005). From the air: Understanding aerial archaeology. Stroud, Gloucestershire: Tempus publishing limited.
 Brophy, K. and Cowley, D. (eds.) (2005). From the air: understanding aerial archaeology. London: The History Press. 
 Deuel, L. (1973). Flights into Yesterday : the story of aerial archaeology. Penguin Books. . .
 Opitz, S. and Cowley, D. (2012). Interpreting Archaeological Topography : Lasers, 3d Data, Observation, Visualisation and Applications. Oxbow Books Ltd. .
 Parcak, S. (2009). Satellite remote sensing for archaeology. Routledge. . .
 Renfrew, C. and Bahn, P. (2016). Archaeology: Theories, Methods and Practice. High Holborn, London: Thames & Hudson Ltd
 Riley, D. N. (1987). Air photography and archaeology. Univ of Pennsylvania. 
 Suguayani. "Multispectral image". Imagine Info. Retrieved 2022-05-13.
 Wilson, D. R . (2000). Air photo interpretation for archaeologists, London: The History Press. (2nd edn.). 
 "Introduction to Aerial Archaeology". Aerial Archeology Research Group. Retrieved 2022-05-13.

External links 

 Emporia State University: Aerial Archaeology
 Aerial and Remote Sensing Archaeology Link and Reference Site
 Aerial Archaeology. AerialArchaeology.com focuses heavily on near-earth imaging technologies such as kite aerial photography, remote-control powered parachutes, balloons, and model airplanes and helicopters. *** Off-line April 20, 2010 ***
 ACE Foundation
 Kite Aerial Photographers - Archaeology
 Sir Henry Wellcome
 Aerial Archaeology in Northern France

Archaeological sub-disciplines
Methods in archaeology
Aerial photography